Limnephilinae is a subfamily of northern caddisflies in the family Limnephilidae. There are at least 65 genera and 600 described species in Limnephilinae.

Genera
These 67 genera belong to the subfamily Limnephilinae:

 Acrophylax Brauer, 1867 i c g
 Allogamus Schmid, 1955 i c g
 Alpopysche Botosaneanu & Giudicelli, 2002
 Anabolia Stephens, 1837 i c g b
 Anisogamodes Martynov, 1924 i c g
 Anisogamus McLachlan, 1874 i c g
 Annitella Klapalek, 1907 i c g
 Arctopora Thomson, 1891 i c g
 Asynarchus McLachlan, 1880 i c g b
 Badukiella Mey, 1979 i c g
 Brachypsyche Schmid, 1952 i c g
 Chaetopterna Martynov, 1913 i c g
 Chaetopteroides Kumanski, 1987 i c g
 Chaetopterygopsis JPEF Stein, 1874 i c g
 Chaetopteryx Stephens, 1829 i c g
 Chiloecia Navas, 1930 i c g
 Chilostigma McLachlan, 1876 i c g b
 Chilostigmodes Martynov, 1914 i c g
 Chionophylax Schmid, 1951 i c g
 Chyrandra Ross, 1944 c g
 Clistoronia Banks, 1916 i c g b
 Clostoeca Banks, 1943 i c g b
 Consorophylax Schmid, 1955 i c g
 Desmona Denning, 1954 i c g b
 Enoicyla Rambur, 1842 i c g
 Enoicylopsis Navas, 1917 i c g
 Frenesia Betten & Mosely, 1940 i c g b
 Glyphopsyche Banks, 1904 i c g b
 Glyphotaelius Stephens, 1833 i c g
 Grammotaulius Kolenati, 1848 i c g
 Grensia Ross, 1944 i c g
 Halesochila Banks, 1907 i c g b
 Halesus Stephens, 1836 i c g
 Hesperophylax Banks, 1916 i c g b
 Homophylax Banks, 1900 i c g b
 Hydatophylax Wallengren, 1891 i c g b
 Isogamus Schmid, 1955 i c g
 Kelgena Mey, 1979 i c g
 Lenarchus Martynov, 1914 i c g b
 Lepnevaina Wiggins, 1987 i c g
 Leptophylax Banks, 1900 i c g
 Leptotaulius Schmid, 1955 i c g
 Limnephilus Leach, 1815 i c g b
 Melampophylax Schmid, 1955 i c g
 Mesophylax McLachlan, 1882 i c g
 Nemotaulius Banks, 1906 i c g b
 Parachiona Thomson, 1891 i c g
 Phanocelia Banks, 1943 i c g b
 Philarctus McLachlan, 1880 i c g
 Philocasca Ross, 1941 i c g b
 Pielus) Navas, 1935 i c g
 Platycentropus Ulmer, 1905 i c g b
 Platyphylax McLachlan, 1871 i c g
 Potamophylax Wallengren, 1891 i c g
 Pseudopsilopteryx Schmid, 1952 i c g
 Psilopterna Martynov, 1915 i c g
 Psilopteryx Stein, 1874 i c g
 Psychoglypha Ross, 1944 i c g b
 Psychoronia Banks, 1916 i c g
 Pycnopsyche Banks, 1905 i c g b
 Rhadicoleptus Wallengren, 1891 i c g
 Rivulophilus Nishimoto, Nozaki, & Ruiter, 2001
 Rizeiella Sipahiler, 1986 i c g
 Stenophylax Kolenati, 1848 i c g
 Thermophylax Nimmo, 1995 i c g
 Vareshiana Marinkovic-Gospodnetic, 1967 i c g
 † Tricheopteryx Cockerell, 1927

Data sources: i = ITIS, c = Catalogue of Life, g = GBIF, b = Bugguide.net

References

Further reading

External links

 

Trichoptera subfamilies
Integripalpia